Aurel Țicleanu (born 20 January 1959) is a Romanian football manager and former player who played as a midfielder.

Playing career

Club career
Țicleanu began his youth career with Metallurgistul Sadu in 1974. He was quickly spotted there by manager Constantin Oţet who brought him to Universitatea Craiova in 1976. He made his professional debut at age 17 with Craiova during the 1976–77 season. Țicleanu spent nine seasons at the club, and won the league title twice, in 1980 and 1981 also reaching the semi-finals of the UEFA Cup in 1983.

In the 1985–86 season, he joined Sportul Studențesc of Bucharest, helping them to a second-place finish in the Divizia A the club's highest ranking ever. He remained at the club four seasons, before joining Cypriot side Olympiakos Nicosia, from where he retired in 1991.

International career
Țicleanu made his full international debut on 29 August 1979 against Poland at the age of 20. He earned 42 caps for the Romania national team, and participated at UEFA Euro 1984.

Managerial career
After retiring as a footballer, Țicleanu went on to become a football coach for a number of teams in Romania including UTA Arad, Oţelul Galaţi, FC U Craiova and Romania U–21 team.

He has also coached various national youth teams and clubs in Cyprus, Albania, Morocco, Bangladesh, Kuwait and Saudi Arabia. His former clubs include Evagoras Paphos, Maghreb Fez, 	Dinamo Tirana, KS Lushnja, Hassania Agadir, Bangladesh U–20 team, Al Sahel and Al Jahra, Corona Brasov and FC Brasov.

In April 2014, he became the head of the scouting department at the Romanian Football Federation. On 27 June 2016, Țicleanu was hired as Qatar SC manager replacing Sebastião Lazaroni.

References

External links
 
 
 
 Țicleanu antrenor la Craiova 

1959 births
Living people
People from Hunedoara County
Association football midfielders
Romanian footballers
Romania international footballers
UEFA Euro 1984 players
CS Universitatea Craiova players
FC Sportul Studențesc București players
Olympiakos Nicosia players
Liga I players
Cypriot First Division players
Romanian expatriate footballers
Romanian expatriate sportspeople in Cyprus
Expatriate footballers in Cyprus
Romanian football managers
FC UTA Arad managers
ASC Oțelul Galați managers
FC U Craiova 1948 managers
Evagoras Paphos managers
AFC Rocar București managers
Maghreb de Fès managers
FK Dinamo Tirana managers
KS Lushnja managers
Hassania Agadir managers
Al Jahra SC managers
CSM Corona Brașov (football) managers
FC Brașov (1936) managers
Qatar SC managers
Ohod Club managers
Kategoria Superiore managers
Romanian expatriate football managers
Expatriate football managers in Cyprus
Romanian expatriate sportspeople in Morocco
Expatriate football managers in Morocco
Romanian expatriate sportspeople in Bangladesh
Expatriate football managers in Bangladesh
Romanian expatriate sportspeople in Albania
Expatriate football managers in Albania
Romanian expatriate sportspeople in Kuwait
Expatriate football managers in Kuwait
Romanian expatriate sportspeople in Saudi Arabia
Expatriate football managers in Saudi Arabia
Romanian expatriate sportspeople in Qatar
Expatriate football managers in Qatar
Al-Sahel SC (Kuwait) managers
Kuwait Premier League managers
Saudi First Division League managers